Maclas is a commune in the Loire department in central France.

Maclas is located near the villages of Véranne and Saint-Appolinard, approximately 50 kilometres south of Lyon. It is located in the Pilat mountain range and its main industries are farming and local industry.

Population

See also
Communes of the Loire department

References

External links
Gazetteer Entry

Communes of Loire (department)